This article covers military uniforms during the American Civil War (1861-1865). 

During the years 1860 - 1865 there were 3 distinct types of uniform in use by the United States Armed Forces. Styles used were traditional similar to those used in the Napoleonic Wars, a regimental dress such as used during the American Revolutionary War and a specialist dress similar to those worn by Lancers and Hussars or an ethnic dress such as Kilts With shortages in 1861 the federal government issued a regulation pattern uniform for all state regiments.

Confederacy
At the onset of the war the Confederate States Army uniforms were highly varied as the majority were made at home. Between 1861-1862 the quartermaster department issued some uniforms but there were severe shortages.

See also
 Uniform of the Union Army
 Uniforms of the Confederate States Armed Forces

References

Bibliography

 Katcher, Philip. Volstad, Ron. (1986) American Civil War armies: Volunteer militia Osprey 
 Spencer, John D. (2006) The American Civil War in the Indian Territory Osprey 
 Emerson, William K. (1996) Encyclopedia of United States Army insignia and uniforms University of Oklahoma Press 
 Taschek, Karen. (2006) The Civil War Chelsea House 

1860s fashion
Military equipment of the American Civil War
United States military uniforms